The Infanta Catarina (1436–1463); was a Portuguese infanta (princess), daughter of King Edward of Portugal and his wife Eleanor of Aragon.

Life
Catherine was born in Lisbon on 26 November 1436. Like her sisters Joan and Eleanor she was considered ambitious, shrewd and willful. She was promised to marry Charles IV of Navarre but he died before the marriage could take place and her brother, after securing the marriages of her sisters to the King of Castile and the Holy Roman Emperor, had no further need of marriage alliances with other houses. Thus, Catherine turned to a religious life in the Convent of Saint Claire. She was a cultivated infanta author of many books regarding morality and religion. She died on 17 June 1463 and is buried in Lisbon at the Carmo Convent.

Ancestry

References 

1436 births
1463 deaths
House of Aviz
People from Lisbon
15th-century Portuguese writers
15th-century Portuguese women writers
Daughters of kings